Joseph Henry Kolker (November 13, 1874 [some sources 1870] – July 15, 1947) was an American stage and film actor and director.

Early years
Kolker was born in Quincy, Illinois.

Career 
Kolker, like fellow actors Richard Bennett and Robert Warwick, had a substantial stage career before entering silent films. He began acting professionally in stock theater in 1895. On stage he appeared opposite actresses such as Edith Wynne Matthison, Bertha Kalich and Ruth Chatterton. 

Kolker began acting in films in 1915. He is best remembered for his movie roles, including one in the ground-breaking Pre-Code film Baby Face (1933) as an elderly CEO. Another well-remembered part is as Mr. Seton, father of Katharine Hepburn and Lew Ayres in the 1938 film Holiday directed by George Cukor.

Kolker entered films as an actor in 1915 and eventually tried his hand at directing. Kolker's best-known directorial effort is Disraeli (1921), starring George Arliss which is now a lost film with only one reel remaining. Prints however are said to exist in Europe and Russia.

Personal life 
Kolker was married to Lillian Carroll; they divorced in 1926. Soon after the divorce, he married Margaret Bruen.

Kolker died on July 15, 1947, aged 72.

Selected filmography

As actor

 The Bigger Man (1915) as John Stoddard
 The Warning (1915) as Robert Denman
 How Molly Made Good (1915, cameo as himself)
 Gloria's Romance (1916) as Dr. Stephen Royce
 The Shell Game (1918) as Lawrence Gray
 Social Hypocrites (1918) as Dr. Frank Simpson
 The House of Mirth (1918) as Lawrence Selden
 The Great Victory (1918) as Kaiser Wilhelm II
 The Parisian Tigress (1919) as Henri Dutray
 Blackie's Redemption (1919) as Fred the Count
 The Red Lantern (1919)
 Tangled Threads (1919) as Dr. MacGregor
 The Brat (1919) as A Dandy
 Her Purchase Price (1919) as Duke of Wryden
 A Man of Stone (1921)
 Any Woman (1925) as Egbert Phillips
 Sally, Irene and Mary (1925) as Marcus Morton
 The Palace of Pleasure (1926) as Premier
 Hell's Four Hundred (1926) as John Gilmore
 Winning the Futurity (1926) (scenes deleted)
 Wet Paint (1926) as A Husband
 A Kiss in a Taxi (1927) as Leon Lambert
 Annie Laurie (1927) as King's Representative
 Rough House Rosie (1927) as W.S. Davids
 Soft Living (1928) as Roidney S. Bowen
 Midnight Rose (1928) as Corbin
 The Charge of the Gauchos (1928) as Viceroy Cisneros
 Don't Marry (1928) as Gen. Willoughby
 Coquette (1929) as Jasper Carter
 The Valiant (1929) as Judge
 Pleasure Crazed (1929) as Col. Farquar
 Love, Live and Laugh (1929) as Enrico
 The Bad One (1930) as Prosecutor
 East Is West (1930) as Butler
 Abraham Lincoln (1930) as New Englander
 The Way of All Men (1930) as Sharp
 Du Barry, Woman of Passion (1930) as D'Aiguillon
 East Is West (1930) as Mr. Benson
 One Heavenly Night (1931) as Prefect of Police
 Don't Bet on Women (1931) as Butterfield
 Doctors' Wives (1931) as Hospital Official
 Quick Millions (1931) as District Attorney
 Indiscreet (1931) as Mr. Woodward
 The Spy (1931) as Tchijinski
 I Like Your Nerve (1931) as Areal Pacheco
 The Unholy Garden (1931) as Col. Lautrac
 The Yellow Ticket (1931) as Passport Clerk
 The Washington Masquerade (1932) as Stapleton
 Jewel Robbery (1932) as Baron Franz
 The First Year (1932) as Peter Barstow
 Devil and the Deep (1932) as Hutton
 Down to Earth (1932) as Randolph
 The Crash (1932) as John Fair
 Faithless (1932) as Mr. Carter
 Rasputin and the Empress (1932) as Chief of Secret Police
 The Keyhole (1933) as Schuyler Brooks
 Gabriel Over the White House (1933) as Sen. Langham - Senate Majority Leader
 Hello, Sister! (1933) as Jameson Brewster, Bank President
 A Bedtime Story (1933) as Agent de Police
 Hell Below (1933) as Adm. Sir Hugh Higby
 The Narrow Corner (1933) as Mr. Blake, Fred's Father
 Baby Face (1933) as Carter
 Notorious But Nice (1933) as Defense Attorney Clark
 The Power and the Glory (1933) as Mr. Borden
 Bureau of Missing Persons (1933) as Theodore Arno
 Golden Harvest (1933) as Henry Flint
 I Loved a Woman (1933) as Mr. Sanborn
 Love, Honor, and Oh Baby! (1933) as The Judge
 Gigolettes of Paris (1933) as Police Interrogator
 Meet the Baron (1933) as Baron Munchausen
 Blood Money (1933) as Newspaper Managing Editor
 Massacre (1934) as Sen. Woolsey
 Bedside (1934) as Maritza's Manager
 I've Got Your Number (1934) as Robert Kirkland
 The Cat and the Fiddle (1934) as  Theatre Manager
 Wonder Bar (1934) as Mr. R.H. Renaud
 Journal of a Crime (1934) as Henri Marcher
 Success at Any Price (1934) as Hatfield
 Sisters Under the Skin (1934) as Jones
 Let's Talk It Over (1934) as Doctor
 Black Moon (1934) as The Psychiatrist
 The Hell Cat (1934) as C.W. Sloane
 Let's Try Again (1934) as Mr. Blake
 Stamboul Quest (1934) as 'Excellency' German War Office
 Whom the Gods Destroy (1934) as Carlo, the Puppeteer
 Blind Date (1934) as J.W. Hartwell, Sr.
 Name the Woman (1934) as Judge Adams
 The Girl From Missouri (1934) as Sen. Titcombe
 She Loves Me Not (1934) as Charles M. Lawton
 Now and Forever (1934) as Mr. Clark
 Million Dollar Ransom (1934) Dr. Davis
 One Exciting Adventure (1934) as Customer
 A Lost Lady (1934) as John Ormsby
 Lady by Choice (1934) as Opper
 Imitation of Life (1934) as Dr. Preston
 Love Time (1934) as Emperor Francis I
 Kid Millions (1934) as Attorney
 The Ghost Walks (1934) as Dr. Kent
 Sing Sing Nights (1934) as Kurt Nordon
 The Band Plays On (1934) as Professor Hackett
 Charlie Chan in Paris (1935) as M. Lamartine
 Society Doctor (1935) as Dr. Harvey
 Red Hot Tires (1935) as Martin Sanford
 The Mystery Man (1935) as Ellwyn A. 'Jo-Jo' Jonas
 One New York Night (1935) as Arthur Carlisle
 Times Square Lady (1935) as Mr. Fielding
 A Dog of Flanders (1935) as Monsieur LaTour, Art Critic
 The Florentine Dagger (1935) as Auctioneer
 The Case of the Curious Bride (1935) as District Attorney Stacey
 Reckless (1935) as Mr. Gearhart
 Go Into Your Dance (1935) as Doctor
 Spring Tonic (1935) as Mr. Enix
 Honeymoon Limited (1935) as Mr. Randall
 Mad Love (1935) as Prefect Rosset
 The Black Room (1935) as Baron Frederick de Berghman
 Here Comes the Band (1935) as Simmon's Attorney
 Diamond Jim (1935) as J.C. Randolf, Bank President
 Ladies Love Danger (1935) as Jose Lopez
 Red Salute (1935) as Dean
 I Live My Life (1935) as Relative at Mrs. Gage's
 Shipmates Forever (1935) as The Doctor
 The Last Days of Pompeii (1935) as Warder
 Three Kids and a Queen (1935) as Crippets
 Frisco Waterfront (1935) as District Attorney
 The Great Impersonation (1935) as Dr. Schmidt
 Collegiate (1936) as Mr. MacGregor
 My Marriage (1936) as Maj. Vaile
 Bullets or Ballots (1936) as Mr. Hollister
 Romeo and Juliet (1936) as Friar Laurence
 Sitting on the Moon (1936) as Worthington
 In His Steps (1936) as Calvin Carver
 The Man Who Lived Twice (1936) as Judge Henry Treacher
 Theodora Goes Wild (1936) as Jonathan Grant
 Great Guy (1936) as Abel Canning
 Under Cover of Night (1937) as District Attorney Pritchard
 Once a Doctor (1937) as Dr. Bruce Nordland
 They Wanted to Marry (1937) as Mr. Hunter
 Green Light (1937) as Dr. Lane
 Maid of Salem (1937) as Crown Chief Justice Laughton
 Let Them Live (1937) as Judge Lederer
 The Devil Is Driving (1937) as Charles Stevens
 Conquest (1937) as Sen. Wybitcki
 Thoroughbreds Don't Cry (1937) as 'Doc' Godfrey
 The Invisible Menace (1938) as Col. Hackett
 Love Is a Headache (1938) as Mr. Sam Ellinger
 The Adventures of Marco Polo (1938) as Nicolo Polo
 Holiday (1938) as Edward Seton
 Safety in Numbers (1938) as Dr. Lawrence Edmonds
 Marie Antoinette (1938) as Court Aide
 Too Hot to Handle (1938) as "Pearly" Todd
 The Cowboy and the Lady (1938) as Horace Smith
 Let Us Live (1939) as Chief of Police
 Union Pacific (1939) as Asa M. Barrows
 Should Husbands Work? (1939) as Taylor
 These Glamour Girls (1939) as Philip S. Griswold II
 Hidden Power (1939) as Weston
 The Real Glory (1939) as The General
 Parents on Trial (1939) as James Wesley
 Here I Am a Stranger (1939) as R.J. Bennett
 Main Street Lawyer (1939) as Donnelly, District Attorney
 Grand Ole Opry (1940) as William C. Scully
 Money and the Woman (1940) as Mr. Rollins, Barbara's Father
 Las Vegas Nights (1941) as John Stevens
 The Man Who Lost Himself (1941) as Mulhausen
 The Great Swindle (1941) as Stewart Cordell
 A Woman's Face (1941) as Judge
 The Parson of Panamint (1941) as Judge Arnold Mason
 Sing for Your Supper (1941) as Myron T. Hayworth
 Reunion in France (1942) as General Bartholomew
 Sarong Girl (1943) as Mr. Jefferson Baxter
 Bluebeard (1944) as Deschamps
 The Secret Life of Walter Mitty (1947) as Dr. Benbow

As director
Kolker directed 18 feature films, most of them lost.

 Santo Icario (1914)
 A Man's Country (1919)
 The Woman Michael Married (1919)
 The Third Generation (1920)
 Bright Skies (1920)
 Heart of Twenty (1920)
 The Palace of Darkened Windows (1920)
 The Greatest Love (1920)
 Bucking the Tiger (1921)
 Who Am I? (1921)
 The Fighter (1921)
 Disraeli (1921)
 The Leopardess (1923)
 Sant'Ilario (1923)
 The Snow Bride (1923)
 The Purple Highway (1923)
 I Will Repay (1923)
 The Great Well (1924)

As writer
 The Man with the Iron Heart (1915, short)
 The Third Generation (1920)

References

External links 

 
 
 
 Henry Kolker photo portraits at NYP Library

1874 births
1947 deaths
Male actors from Illinois
American male film actors
American male silent film actors
20th-century American male actors
Male actors from Los Angeles
Actors from Quincy, Illinois
Film directors from California
Film directors from Illinois
Male actors from Berlin
German emigrants to the United States
Burials at Forest Lawn Memorial Park (Glendale)